A motherhouse or Mother House is the principal house or community for a religious institute, for example the Missionaries of Charity's "Mother House" in Kolkata, which functions as the congregation's headquarters. A motherhouse would normally be where the residence and offices of the religious superior of the institute would be located. If the institute is divided geographically, it is referred to as the provincial motherhouse and would be where the regional superior would be in residence.

References